Enochrus pygmaeus is a species of water scavenger beetle in the family Hydrophilidae. It is found in the Caribbean Sea, Central America, and North America.

Subspecies
These three subspecies belong to the species Enochrus pygmaeus:
 Enochrus pygmaeus nebulosus (Say, 1824)
 Enochrus pygmaeus pectoralis (LeConte, 1855)
 Enochrus pygmaeus pygmaeus (Fabricius, 1792)

References

Further reading

 

Hydrophilinae
Articles created by Qbugbot
Beetles described in 1792